Kilroy was here is an American expression that became popular during World War II, typically seen in graffiti.
Kilroy Was Here may also refer to:
Kilroy Was Here (album), a 1983 album by Styx
Kilroy Was Here (1947 film), an American comedy film
Kilroy Was Here (1983 film), a short film made to tie in with the Styx album
Killroy Was Here (2022 film), an American horror anthology film based on the graffiti phenomenon